ASJA may refer to:

 Asja, a given name (including a list of people with the name)
American Society of Journalists and Authors
Anjuman Sunnat-ul-Jamaat Association, Trinidad and Tobago
AB Svenska Järnvägsverkstädernas Aeroplanavdelning, a former Swedish aircraft manufacturing company
Association for Student Judicial Affairs, former name of the Association for Student Conduct Administration

See also
 ASJA Boys' College, Trinidad and Tobago